Ross County is a county in the Appalachian region of the U.S. state of Ohio. As of the 2020 United States Census, the population was 77,093. Its county seat is Chillicothe, the first and third capital of Ohio. Established on August 20, 1798, the county is named for Federalist Senator James Ross of Pennsylvania.
Ross County comprises the Chillicothe, OH Micropolitan Statistical Area, which is also included in the Columbus-Marion-Zanesville, OH Combined Statistical Area.

History
Ross County was described by Ephraim George Squier and Edwin Hamilton Davis as having almost "one hundred enclosures of various sizes, and five hundred mounds" in their book, Ancient Monuments of the Mississippi Valley (1848). They described the Indian-built earthworks as ranging from five to 30 feet in size, and enclosures of one to 50 acres large. These included Serpent Mound, Fort Ancient, Mound City, and Seip Earthworks (both now part of Hopewell Culture National Historical Park), and Newark Earthworks.

Geography

The Scioto River flows southward through the east-central part of the county. Paint Creek drains the lower central part of the county, flowing eastward to its terminus with the Scioto at a point southeast of Chillicothe. The county terrain consists of frequent wooded hills, with the intermediate level areas devoted to agriculture. The county's highest point is Farrell Hill, six miles (10 km) northeast of Bainbridge. Ross County is the second-largest county by land area in Ohio, after Ashtabula County, as well as the fifth-largest by total area.

Adjacent counties

 Pickaway County - north
 Hocking County - northeast
 Jackson County - southeast
 Pike County - south
 Highland County - southwest
 Fayette County - northwest

Protected areas

 Adena State Memorial
 Great Seal State Park
 Hopewell Culture National Historical Park
 Paint Creek State Park (part)
 Pleasant Valley Wildlife Area
 Ross Lake Wilderness Area
 Scioto Trail State Forest
 Scioto Trail State Park (part of American Discovery Trail)
 Tar Hollow State Forest (part)

Demographics

2000 census
As of the 2000 United States Census, there were 73,345 people, 27,136 households, and 19,185 families in the county. The population density was 106/sqmi (41.1/km2). There were 29,461 housing units at an average density of 42.7/sqmi (16.5/km2). The racial makeup of the county was 91.74% White, 6.20% Black or African American, 0.31% Native American, 0.35% Asian, 0.02% Pacific Islander, 0.19% from other races, and 1.20% from two or more races. 0.58% of the population were Hispanic or Latino of any race.

There were 27,136 households, out of which 32.70% had children under the age of 18 living with them, 55.20% were married couples living together, 11.10% had a female householder with no husband present, and 29.30% were non-families. 24.90% of all households were made up of individuals, and 10.30% had someone living alone who was 65 years of age or older. The average household size was 2.50 and the average family size was 2.97.

The county population contained 24.00% under the age of 18, 8.60% from 18 to 24, 31.60% from 25 to 44, 23.60% from 45 to 64, and 12.20% who were 65 years of age or older. The median age was 37 years. For every 100 females there were 108.30 males. For every 100 females age 18 and over, there were 109.00 males.

The median income for a household in the county was $37,117, and the median income for a family was $43,241. Males had a median income of $35,892 versus $23,399 for females. The per capita income for the county was $17,569. About 9.10% of families and 12.00% of the population were below the poverty line, including 15.10% of those under age 18 and 10.20% of those age 65 or over.

2010 census
As of the 2010 United States Census, there were 78,064 people, 28,919 households, and 19,782 families in the county. The population density was 113/sqmi (43.7/km2). There were 32,148 housing units at an average density of 46.6/sqmi (18.0/km2). The racial makeup of the county was 90.7% white, 6.2% black or African American, 0.4% Asian, 0.3% American Indian, 0.3% from other races, and 2.1% from two or more races. Those of Hispanic or Latino origin made up 1.0% of the population. In terms of ancestry, 27.0% were German, 15.2% were Irish, 12.5% were American, and 10.5% were English.

Of the 28,919 households, 32.8% had children under the age of 18 living with them, 50.2% were married couples living together, 12.6% had a female householder with no husband present, 31.6% were non-families, and 26.2% of all households were made up of individuals. The average household size was 2.48 and the average family size was 2.95. The median age was 39.8 years.

The median income for a household in the county was $42,626 and the median income for a family was $50,081. Males had a median income of $42,721 versus $32,374 for females. The per capita income for the county was $20,595. About 13.1% of families and 17.3% of the population were below the poverty line, including 24.7% of those under age 18 and 8.2% of those age 65 or over.

Government

County officials
County officials are (as of June 2019):
 County Auditor Robyn M. Brewster
 County Board of Elections
 Stephen A. Madru
 David Glass
 Beth Neal
 Dan Cryder
 Clerk of Courts Ty D. Hinton
 Board of Commissioners
 James “Oody” Lowe
 Jack Everson 
 Dwight A. Garrett
 Ross County Court of Common Pleas:
 Judge Michael M. Ater
 Judge Matthew Schmidt
 Probate and Juvenile Court Judge J. Jeffrey Benson
 Magistrate John Di Cesare
 County Coroner Ben Trotter
 County Engineer Charles R. Ortman
 County Prosecutor Jeffrey C. Marks
 County Recorder Kathleen "Kathy" Dunn
 County Treasurer Stephen A. Neal Jr.
 County Sheriff George W. Lavender

Politics
Ross is a generally Republican county in Presidential and Congressional elections, although until recent years, Democratic candidates perform fairly well in the county. The last Democrat to win a majority in the county was Lyndon Johnson in 1964, while Bill Clinton won a plurality in 1996. In 2008, Republican John McCain won 52% of the county's vote.

Ross is part of Ohio's 2nd congressional district, which is held by Republican Brad Wenstrup.

|}

Education

Pickaway-Ross Career & Technology Center
Pickaway-Ross lies in the Northern part of the county. Students from the following affiliated Ross and Pickaway county districts attend the vocational school:
 Adena Local School District (Ross County)
 Chillicothe City School District (Ross County)
 Huntington Local School District (Ross County)
 Paint Valley Local School District (Ross County)
 Southeastern Local School District (Ross County)
 Unioto Local School District (Ross County)
 Zane Trace Local School District (Ross County)
 Circleville City School District (Pickaway County)
 Logan Elm Local School District (Pickaway County)
 Westfall Local School District (Pickaway County)

Ohio University Chillicothe
Ohio University established a regional campus in Chillicothe in 1966. The university has over 2,500 students enrolled as of 2010, ranging from traditional-aged students and non-traditional learners.

Communities

City
 Chillicothe (county seat)

Villages

 Adelphi
 Bainbridge
 Clarksburg
 Frankfort
 Kingston
 South Salem

Census-designated places
 Andersonville
 Bourneville
 Richmond Dale or Richmondale

Unincorporated communities

 Alma
 Anderson
 Austin
 Brownsville
 Denver
 Fruitdale
 Greenland
 Hallsville
 Harper
 Higby
 Hopetown
 Humboldt
 Kinnikinnick
 Knockemstiff
 Lattaville
 Lickskillet
 Londonderry
 Lyndon
 Massieville
 Metzger
 Mooresville
 Musselman
 Nipgen
 North Fork Village
 Pleasant Grove
 Pleasant Valley
 Pride
 Roxabell
 Schooley
 Slate Mills
 Spargursville
 Storms
 Summithill
 Tucson
 Vigo
 Yellowbud

Townships

 Buckskin
 Colerain
 Concord
 Deerfield
 Franklin
 Green
 Harrison
 Huntington
 Jefferson
 Liberty
 Paint
 Paxton
 Scioto
 Springfield
 Twin
 Union

Notable people
 Clyde Beatty (1903-1965) - lion tamer and animal trainer
 Blue Jacket (1743-1810) - Shawnee War Chief
 William Granville Cochran (1844-1932) - Illinois state judge and legislator
 Esther Housh (1840–1898) - social reformer, author, editor
 Donald Ray Pollock (1954) - author
 John Purdue (1802-1876) - founding benefactor of Purdue University
 Frederick Madison Roberts (1879-1952) - great-grandson of Sally Hemings and Thomas Jefferson, first African-American elected to office on the West Coast (elected to California Assembly in 1918), and "dean of the assembly" who helped found the University of California at Los Angeles.

See also
 National Register of Historic Places listings in Ross County, Ohio

References

External links
 
 Ross County Government website
 Ross County Commissioners

 
Appalachian Ohio
Counties of Appalachia
1798 establishments in the Northwest Territory
Populated places established in 1798